Captrain France,  formerly VFLI, is a French freight rail company. It is a subsidiary of SNCF's Rail Logistics Europe. The company was formed in 1998 as a low cost short line and industrial railway operator.

History
VFLI was established in 1998 by SNCF to operate as a low cost operation, initially the company took over the operations of two industrial railway systems: Voies Ferrées des Landes (VFL) and Mines Dominiales de Potasse d'Alsace.

In 2000 the company began a joint venture with Compagnie des chemins de fer départementaux (CFD) namedVoies Ferrées du Morvan to operate the 87 km Avallon-Autun railway line, and in 2001 took over operations on the Houllières du Bassin de Lorraine (HBL) via a subsidiary 'VFLI Cargo.

Up to 2007 the company was involved in the construction of LGV Est through the subsidiary Fertis.

In 2007, VFLI was certified to run trains on the full extent of the French national railway network owned by Réseau Ferré de France. By 2008 the company was providing services for around forty industrial sites, with clients having included Rhodia, Arkema, Arcelor, Renault and Coke de Carling, Ciments français, Lafarge, Elf, Port Edouard Herriot (Lyon), ALZ, Smurfit SCF in Facture and PSA (in Trnava, Slovakia), other contracts included transport of combustion waste from Protires'' waste processing plant in Strasbourg, work sub-contracted from SNCF and transportation from ports.

In January 2021, VFLI was rebranded Captrain France.

Current operations
As of 2012 VFLI's operations are in four main areas: main rail freight in France; rail freight operations at industrial sites; rail infrastructure train haulage; and short haul operations including port railways.

Main line freight rail accounted in 2011 for nearly two-thirds of VFLI's turnover, representing a turnover of 67.7 million Euros, compared to 5.4 million Euros in 2007.

Rolling stock and facilities

In 2010 VFLI owned ~100 diesel locomotives, mostly shunting and short trip locomotives. as well as ~800 wagons.

The company also operates rolling stock workshops, carrying out maintenance and refurbishment.

Notes

References

External links

Company website (in French)
Alternate company Website (in French)

Captrain
Railway companies established in 1998
Railway companies of France
1998 establishments in France